Uropterygius oligospondylus is a moray eel.

Description
It has fewer vertebrae than its congenerate animals, a gray body background with a blackish reticular pattern, and a greater body depth at gill opening 7.3.

References

concolor
Fish described in 2008